Hepanhamaparvovirus is a genus of viruses that belongs to the Hapanhamavirinae subfamily of the family Parvoviridae. Insects and shrimps serve as natural hosts. Infection leads to mortality in the early larval and postlarval stages of the shrimp. There is only one species in this genus: Decapod hepanhamaparvovirus 1.

Structure
Viruses in genus Hepanhamaparvovirus are non-enveloped, with T=1 icosahedral symmetry and round geometries. The diameter is around 21-22 nm. Genomes are linear, around 6kb in length.

Life cycle
Viral replication is nuclear. Entry into the host cell is achieved by attachment to host receptors, which mediate clathrin-mediated endocytosis. Replication follows the rolling-hairpin model. DNA-templated transcription, with some alternative splicing mechanism is the method of transcription. The virus exits the host cell by nuclear pore export. Insects and shrimps serve as the natural host.

References

External links
 Viralzone: Hepandensovirus
  ICTV Hepandensovirus

Parvoviruses
Virus genera